Mad Gab is a board game involving words. At least two teams of 2–12 players have two minutes to sound out three puzzles. The puzzles are known as mondegreens and contain small words that, when put together, make a word or phrase. For example, "These If Hill Wore" when pronounced quickly sounds like "The Civil War". There are two levels, easy and hard. The faster the puzzles are answered, the more points the players score.

This game uses phonetics, which is a branch of linguistics. This game is a test for the human brain to process sounds based on simpler English-written sounds into a meaningful word or phrase. The game is designed where a person would not be able to decode the meaning of the phrase unless spoken out loud and listened; reading the phrase silently will not allow the player to decode the meaning because sounds would have to be encoded into meaningful English words.

Game versions
Bible Mad Gab, released in 2000, references the NIV, e.g. "know Ozark".

See also

 Ambiguity
 Amphibology
 Double entendre
 Eggcorn
 Folk etymology
 Holorime
 Ladle Rat Rotten Hut
 Mairzy Doats
 Malapropism
 Mondegreen
 Same-sounding phrases
 Phono-semantic matching
 Relaxed pronunciation
 Soramimi

External links
 

Board games introduced in 1996
Mattel games
Word board games